Jakubov is a village in Malacky District in the Bratislava Region of western Slovakia close to the town of Malacky, north-west of Slovakia's capital Bratislava.

Genealogical resources
The records for genealogical research are available at the state archive "Statny Archiv in Bratislava, Slovakia"
 Roman Catholic church records (births/marriages/deaths): 1672-1895 (parish A)

See also
 List of municipalities and towns in Slovakia

References

External links

 Official page
https://web.archive.org/web/20071027094149/http://www.statistics.sk/mosmis/eng/run.html
Surnames of living people in Jakubov

Villages and municipalities in Malacky District